La Galissonnière was the lead ship of her class of six light cruisers built for the  (French Navy) during the 1930s. She was named in honour of Roland-Michel Barrin de La Galissonière. During World War II, she served with Vichy France.

Design and description
The La Galissonnière class was designed as an enlarged and improved version of the preceding . Their crew consisted of 557 men in peacetime and 612 in wartime.

History
La Galissonnière was at first assigned to the 2nd Light Squadron in the Mediterranean until October 1937, when she formed the 3rd Cruiser Division at Toulon, together with her sister ships Jean de Vienne and Marseillaise.

At the outbreak of World War II, La Galissonnière carried out patrol duties off the Tunisian coast until mid-November 1939, when she started a major refit at Brest until the end of February 1940. She then was based at Toulon until the French surrender in June.

From January 1941, she was part of the Vichy "High Seas Force" at Toulon. Two of the three cruisers from the 3rd Cruisers Division – she and Marseillaise – never went to high sea due to lack of fuel, except in November 1940, to cover the return to Toulon of the battleship Provence, severely damaged by British gunfire in July 1940 during Operation Catapult. However, La Galissonnière was effectively disarmed and inactive.

When the Germans occupied Vichy France, she was scuttled on 27 November 1942 to prevent her capture by the Germans and Italians. The cruiser shared the drydock with Dunkerque, and her captain moved her forward and opened the sea valves so that she would sink and block the gates.

Italian FR 12

Allocated to the Kingdom of Italy after some political delays, she was subsequently raised by the Regia Marina (Italian Royal Navy) on 3 March 1943, repaired and renamed FR 12. Italy got a good deal of French ships in November 1942 besides the La Galissonnière: two light cruisers, 11 destroyers, 11 escort ships, nine submarines, and 10 minesweepers.

A refit began, but this had not finished at time of the Italian armistice (nearly 60% of the ship was rebuilt). The intention to incorporate the former French ship into the Regia Marina was, however, undermined by Italy's chronic oil fuel shortages.

While in German hands, she was damaged by U.S. bombers on 24 November 1943, after the Italian armistice. La Galissonière eventually sank on 18 August 1944 in an air raid by B-25 Mitchells of the United States Army Air Forces′ 321st Bombardment Group.

The hulk was raised and finally scrapped in 1952.

Notes

Bibliography

External links 
 La Galissoniere ラ･ガリソニエール Photographs
 CoatneyHistory:  La Galissoniere from U.S. Office of Naval Intelligence ONI 202, Italian Naval Vessels recognition manual
 FR.12 Marina Militare website

La Galissonnière-class cruisers
World War II cruisers of France
Naval ships of France captured by Italy during World War II
Cruisers sunk by aircraft
1933 ships
World War II warships scuttled at Toulon
Ships sunk by US aircraft
Maritime incidents in November 1942
Maritime incidents in August 1944